Karen Rose Montgomery (November 28, 1949 – December 4, 2015) was an American actress and producer. Born in Chicago, Montgomery and her family later moved to California, where she graduated from UC Berkeley.

She appeared on multiple television series including Kojak, Nero Wolfe, Aloha Paradise and L.A. Law. She played Mistress Beata, the Elected One of the titular planet, in the Star Trek: The Next Generation episode "Angel One." Montgomery later worked as a producer for several television shows, and independent films. She and her husband Christopher Monger produced a documentary about Roy London in 2005. It was shown at the Tribeca Film Festival.

Montgomery died of breast cancer in Los Angeles on December 4, 2015, aged 66.

Filmography
Actress
Going in Style (1979)
Coast to Coast (1980)
Willie & Phil (1980)
Amazon Women on the Moon (1987)
Producer
Diary of a Hitman (1991)
'Til There Was You (1997)
Row Your Boat (1998)

References

External links

1949 births
2015 deaths
American television actresses
Television producers from California
Actresses from Chicago
American film actresses
20th-century American actresses
University of California, Berkeley alumni
Deaths from breast cancer
Deaths from cancer in California
Television producers from Illinois
American women television producers
21st-century American women